Corilla humberti is a species of air-breathing land snail, a terrestrial pulmonate gastropod mollusk in the family Corillidae.

Distribution
Distribution of Corilla humberti includes Sri Lanka.

References

External links

Corillidae
Gastropods described in 1864